is a Japanese politician of the Liberal Democratic Party (LDP), a member of the House of Representatives in the Diet (national legislature). A native of Nagoya, Aichi and graduate of the University of Tokyo, he worked at The Sumitomo Bank from 1983 to 1991. He was elected to the House of Representatives for the first time in 2003. His father is former Health minister Sohei Miyashita.

References

External links 
 Official website in Japanese.

1958 births
Living people
People from Nagoya
University of Tokyo alumni
Members of the House of Representatives (Japan)
Liberal Democratic Party (Japan) politicians
Sumitomo Mitsui Financial Group
21st-century Japanese politicians